The 1829 Massachusetts gubernatorial election was held on April 6.

National Republican Governor Levi Lincoln Jr. was re-elected to a fifth term in office over Democrat Marcus Morton.

General election

Candidates
Levi Lincoln Jr., incumbent Governor since 1825 (National Republican)
Marcus Morton, Associate Justice of the Supreme Judicial Court, former acting Governor and nominee in 1828 (Democratic)

Campaign
Justice Morton once again refused his candidacy but was nonetheless promoted by David Henshaw against his wishes, for want of a willing candidate. Nevertheless, Morton privately took personal and political pride in the support he did receive, taking it as evidence the new Democratic Party could be a success.

Results
With low turnout and Morton's refusal, the election was a landslide for Lincoln. Morton carried 35 towns, 17 more than he had carried in 1828.

See also
 1829–1830 Massachusetts legislature

References

Governor
1829
Massachusetts
November 1829 events